In the context of mailing lists, discussion groups, discussion forums, bulletin boards, newsgroups, and 
wikis a contribution is off-topic if it is not within the bounds of the current discussion, and on-topic if it is.

Even on very specialized forums and lists, off-topic posting is not necessarily frowned upon, but a common netiquette convention is to mark a new off-topic posting or email by beginning it with "OT" - for example in a forum discussing the Linux operating system someone might post: "OT: Did anyone else see that giant skunk?". 

Posting off-topic messages to deliberately aggravate other members is a form of trolling.

See also 
 Netiquette

References

External links
NewsReaders.com: Getting Started: Netiquette
Netiquette of sending
Off Topic Forum

Internet forum terminology

ru:Сетевой этикет#Оффтопик